Dallas–Fort Worth National Cemetery is a United States national cemetery located in the city of Dallas, Dallas County, Texas (United States). Administered by the United States Department of Veterans Affairs, it encompasses , and as of 2021, had over 73,000 interments.

History 

Dallas–Fort Worth National Cemetery was established in 2000 on the eastern shore of Mountain Creek Lake north of Dallas Baptist University. It is the sixth National Cemetery created in Texas and was created to meet the future needs of American veterans, nearly 1.5 million of whom live in the state of Texas. It currently has space for over 280,000 interments. It already serves as the resting place for several soldiers who have died in the Iraq War and War in Afghanistan (2001–2021).

Notable interments
 Medal of Honor recipients
 Candelario Garcia (1944–2013), for action in the Vietnam War
 James L. Stone (1922–2012), for action in the Korean War
 Others
 Mac Curtis (1939–2013), Rockabilly musician
 Earl Lunsford (1933–2008), professional football player and executive

 Glenn McDuffie (1927–2014), US Navy sailor known for being the subject of the V-J Day in Times Square photograph
 Pat Summerall (1930–2013), American football player and television sportscaster
 Jim Swink (1936–2014), American football halfback
 Royce Womble (1931–2016), American football running back
 Patrick Zamarripa (1983–2016), US Navy sailor and Dallas Police officer killed in the line of duty in the 2016 shooting of Dallas police officers

References

External links 
 National Cemetery Administration
 Dallas-Fort Worth National Cemetery
 
 
 Aerial Tour of the DFW National Cemetery

Landmarks in Dallas
Cemeteries in Dallas
United States national cemeteries